Saigon station is a railway station in District 3, Ho Chi Minh City, Vietnam. The station is a major hub in the national railway network. Located about 1 km from the city center, Saigon railway station is the final station on the North–South railway, and the southernmost point of the Vietnamese railways. Despite the city being named Ho Chi Minh City after the Vietnam War, the name of the station has remained the same.

History

The original station, which opened in 1885, was located across from Bến Thành Market in District 1. The current station, originally a baggage holding and shipping centre, was constructed by the French colonists in the early 1930s, as part of the Hanoi-Saigon Railway.

Every year, one or two months before Tết, thousands of people queue all day at the station to buy tickets home, because it is the main booking office of Vietnam Railways. Though electronic booking machines have been adopted, the queues continue, due to the monopoly of the railway.

The head office is in 136 Ham Nghi Street, Ben Thanh ward, district 1, Ho Chi Minh city.

Binh Trieu station
Due to the requirements of urban planning, the city government is considering the relocation of the station to the city outskirts at Binh Trieu (Binh Trieu Railway Station).

References

External links 
 
 Saigon Railways Official Website

Transport in Ho Chi Minh City
Railway stations in Vietnam
Buildings and structures in Ho Chi Minh City